Hymenobacter terrenus  is a Gram-negative, non-spore-forming, short rod-shaped and non-motile bacterium from the genus of Hymenobacter. It has been isolated from biological soil crusts from Liangcheng, Inner Mongolia.

References

terrenus
Bacteria described in 2015